The National Academy of Agricultural Sciences (NAAS) is a Government of India funded agency, established in 1990, is a research platform in the fields of crop husbandry, animal husbandry, fisheries and agro-forestry. It acts as a research base for agro-scientists to formulate their advice to the policy makers in discussion with the agricultural and agro industrial communities. The Academy is located at the National Agricultural Science Centre Complex, Pusa, in New Delhi, India.

Profile 

The National Academy of Agricultural Sciences (NAAS) owes it origin to the vision of the late Dr. B. P. Pal, noted Indian agricultural scientist, who first put forth the idea of setting up a back-end chat room for assisting the decision makers on policies aimed at the development of agriculture in India. Tailing his advice, the Academy was formed in 1990 to assist research in agricultural and related sciences, to provide a forum for agricultural scientists for deliberations, and to organize seminars, congresses and conferences for the propagation of the philosophy of agriculture, which it has been carrying out since inception. It also maintains a Corporate Membership scheme for the corporate sector.

Projects
The Academy undertakes several projects, planned in advance, every year. The major projects selected for research for the year 2014 are:
 Climate Resilient Livestock Production
 Breaking low-productivity syndrome of soybean in India
 Reservoir Fisheries Development in India: Policy and Management Options
 Practical and affordable approaches in implement precision
 Carbon Economy in Indian Agriculture
 Hydroponic Fodder Production in India
 Together with Farm Industry
 Livestock Breeding Policy in India
 Monitoring and Evaluation on AREE4D
 Linking Farmers with Market

Regional chapters
NAAS spreads its activities across the country through fifteen regional chapters, located at various agriculturally important places in India. The regional offices are mandated to create public awareness through lectures, seminars, conferences and workshops, publish magazines, journals and other print media methods and prepare databases of agricultural scientists region wise and generate interest among aspiring scientists. The regional offices are located at Bangalore, Bhubaneswar, Chennai, Guwahati, Hyderabad, Imphal, Jodhpur, Karnal, Kochi, Kolkata, Lucknow, Ludhiana, Mumbai, Nagpur and Patna.

Awards
NAAS encourages research in Agricultural, environmental and nutrition Sciences, by way of awards and medals bi-annually.
 Memorial Awards 
 Recognition Awards 
 Young Scientists Awards 
 Endowment Awards

Further, the Academy has put in place five research fellowships of three-year tenure, NAAS –TATA Young Scientists’ Research Fellowship, aimed at supporting young scientists working in various research centres, State agricultural universities and other Indian Council of Agricultural Research organizations. The fellowships are funded by Sir Dorabji Tata Trust.

Journal Scoring 
The academy for assessing the quality of the published work of the fellow nominees had developed a 'Score' with which it rates various journals. It has two categories with two different criteria. For the journals which has the Thomson Reuters' Impact Factor (Journal Citation Reports)  it assigns a score of 6.00 plus the journal’s Impact Factor with capping on 20.00. And for others which does have any Impact Factor, it uses various measures like frequency of publication, editorial board constitution, article contributions from overseas, citation analysis of articles etc. The year 2016 scored/rated journals are found here.

Publications
NAAS has published several books, journals and reports, of which some of the notable ones are:

 Felicitation Volume on Occasion of Dr. M. S. Swaminathan’s 70th Birthday.
 Uncommon Opportunities for Achieving Sustainable Food and Nutrition Security. An Agenda for Science and Public policy 
 Invited and Contributed Papers (Two volumes) of Third Agricultural Science Congress held at PAU Ludhiana 
 Action Plan on Conservation, Management and Use of Agro-Biodiversity 
 Converting Deserts into Oasis.
 State of Indian Agriculture.
 Revival of the Agricultural Crescent of Bihar - a Study Report.
 Degraded and Wastelands of India – Status and Spatial Distribution
 Conservation Agriculture – Innovations for Improving Efficiency, Equity and Environment – Selected Papers of 4th World Congress on Conservation Agriculture
 State of Indian Agriculture – Indo-Gangetic Plains.
 Proceedings of the X Agricultural Science Congress on the theme Soil, Plant and Animal Health for Enhanced and Sustained Agricultural Productivity

In addition, the Institute has been publishing NAS Year Book since 1994, NAAS News, a quarterly journal, Agricultural News, a journal based on agricultural news on dailies, Policy Papers and Year Planners.

See also

 Indian Council of Agricultural Research
 Indian Agricultural Research Institute

References

External links
 
 

Agricultural research institutes in India